The term "National Treasure" has been used in Japan to denote cultural properties since 1897.
The definition and the criteria have changed since the introduction of the term. These archaeological materials adhere to the current definition, and have been designated national treasures since the Law for the Protection of Cultural Properties came into effect on June 9, 1951. The items are selected by the Ministry of Education, Culture, Sports, Science and Technology based on their "especially high historical or artistic value". The list presents 49 materials or sets of materials from ancient to feudal Japan, spanning a period from about 4,500 BC to 1361 AD. The actual number of items is more than 49 because groups of related objects have been combined into single entries. Most of the items have been excavated from tombs, kofun, sutra mounds or other archaeological sites. The materials are 
housed in museums (31), temples (9), shrines (8) and a university (1) in 27 cities of Japan. The Tokyo National Museum houses the greatest number of archaeological national treasures, with 7 of the 49.

The Japanese Paleolithic marks the beginning of human habitation in Japan. It is generally accepted that human settlement did not occur before 38,000 BC, although some sources suggest the date to be as early as 50,000 BC. Archaeological artifacts from the paleolithic era consist of stone tools of various types, indicative of a hunter-gatherer society. A set of 1965 such tools has been designated as the oldest National Treasure. From about 14,000 to 8,000 BC, the society gradually transformed to one characterized by the creation of pottery used for storage, cooking, bone burial and possibly ceremonial purposes. People continued to subsist on hunting, fishing and gathering, but evidence points to a gradual decrease in the nomadic lifestyle. Potsherds of unornamented pottery from the oldest archaeological sites constitute some of the world's oldest pottery. These are followed by linear-relief, punctated and nail-impressed pottery types. The first cord-marked pottery dates to 8,000 BC. Cord-marked pottery required a technique of pressing twisted cords into the clay, or by rolling cord-wrapped sticks across the clay. Pottery techniques reached their apogee during the Middle Jōmon period with the emergence of fire-flame pottery created by sculpting and carving coils of clay applied to vessel rims, resulting in a rugged appearance. A set of 57 items of fire-flame pottery, dating to around 4,500 BC, has been designated as National Treasure. Archaeologists consider that such pottery may have had a symbolic meaning or was used ceremonially. Dogū—small clay figurines depicting humans and animals—can be dated to the earliest Jōmon period but their prevalence increased dramatically in the middle Jōmon. Many of these depict women with exaggerated breasts and enlarged buttocks, considered to be a fertility symbol. Five dogū from 3000 to 1000 BC have been designated as National Treasures.

The ensuing Yayoi period is characterized by great technological advances such as wet-rice agriculture or bronze and iron casting, which were introduced from the mainland. Iron knives and axes, followed by bronze swords, spears and mirrors, were brought to Japan from Korea and China. Later all of these were produced locally. The primary artistic artifacts, with the exception of Yayoi pottery, are bronze weapons, such as swords, halberds and dōtaku, ritual bells. The bells were often discovered in groups on a hillside buried with the weapons. A few bells feature the earliest Japanese depiction of people and animals. In addition ornamental jewels were found. The weapons that have been excavated are flat and thin, suggesting a symbolic use. Due to rusting, few iron objects have survived from this period. Burial mounds in square, and later round, enclosures were common in the Yayoi period. The starting date of the Kofun period (c. 250–300 AD) is defined by the appearance of large-scale keyhole-shaped kofun mound tombs, thought to mark imperial burials. Typical burial goods include mirrors, beads, Sue ware, weapons and later horse gear. One of the most well-known tombs, whose content of warrior-related items has been designated as National Treasure, is the late 6th century Fujinoki Tomb. Mirrors, swords and curved jewels, which constitute the Imperial Regalia of Japan, appear as early as the middle Yayoi period, and are abundant in Kofun period tombs. Characteristic of most kofun are haniwa clay terra cotta figures whose origin and purpose is unknown. A haniwa of an armoured man has been designated as National Treasure; and a 1st-century gold seal, designated a National Treasure, shows one of the earliest mentions of Japan or Wa.
 
Buddhism arrived in Japan in the mid–6th century Asuka period, and was officially adopted in the wake of the Battle of Shigisan in 587, after which Buddhist temples began to be constructed. The new religion and customs fundamentally transformed Japanese society and the arts. Funerary traditions such as cremation and the practice of placing epitaphs in graves were imported from China and Korea. Following the treatment of Buddhist relics, the cremated remains in a glass container were wrapped in a cloth and placed in an outer container. Epitaphs, which recorded the lives of the deceased on silver or bronze rectangular strips, were particularly popular from the latter half of the 7th to the end of the 8th century (late Asuka and Nara period). Four epitaphs and a number of cinerary urns and reliquaries containing bones have been designated as National Treasures. Other archaeological National Treasures from the Buddhist era include ritual items buried in the temple foundations of the Golden Halls of Tōdai-ji and Kōfuku-ji in Nara. According to an ancient Buddhist prophecy, the world would enter a dark period in 1051; consequently in the late Heian period the belief in the saving powers of Maitreya or Miroku, the Buddha to be, became widespread. Believers buried scriptures and images to gain merit and to prepare for the coming Buddha. This practice, which continued into the Kamakura period, required the transcription of sutras according to strict ritual protocols, their placement in protective reliquary containers and burial in the earth of sacred mountains, shrines or temples to await the future Buddha. The oldest known sutra mound is that of Fujiwara no Michinaga from 1007 on Mount Kinpu, who buried one lotus sutra and five other sutras that he had written in 998. Its sutra container has been designated as National Treasure.

Statistics
All of the 49 National Treasures are presently located in Japan; two were discovered in China and three were found in Japan, but the exact locations of their excavation sites is unknown. The excavation sites of the remaining 44 treasures are contained in the following table.

Usage
The table's columns (except for Details and Image) are sortable by pressing the arrow symbols. 
Name: name of the national treasure as registered in the Database of National Cultural Properties
Details: more information about the object such as size and type of items (if the national treasure comprises more than one item)
Date: period and year of the item; column entries sort by year or start year of a period if only a period is known
Excavation site: "site-name town-name prefecture-name"; column entries sort as "prefecture-name town-name site-name"
Present location: "temple/museum/shrine-name town-name prefecture-name"; column entries sort as "prefecture-name town-name temple/museum/shrine-name"
Image: picture of the national treasure or of the excavation site

Treasures

See also
Nara Research Institute for Cultural Properties
Tokyo Research Institute for Cultural Properties
Independent Administrative Institution National Museum

Notes

References

Bibliography

Archaeological artifacts
Archaeology of Japan
Archaeology-related lists
Archaeological